Mount Francis is a massive, ridgelike mountain,  high, that overlooks Tucker Glacier from the north, standing between Tyler Glacier and Staircase Glacier in the Admiralty Mountains of Antarctica. It was mapped by the United States Geological Survey from surveys and U.S. Navy air photos, 1960–62, and was named by the Advisory Committee on Antarctic Names for Henry S. Francis, Jr., Director of the International Cooperation and Information Program at the Office of Antarctic Programs, National Science Foundation. Francis wintered-over at Little America V Station in 1958 and made visits to Antarctica in other seasons.

References

Mountains of Victoria Land
Borchgrevink Coast